Silje Elin Bolset is a Norwegian handball player. She played 16 matches for the Norway women's national handball team from 1996 to 1997.  She participated at the 1996 European Women's Handball Championship, where the Norwegian team placed second.

References

Year of birth missing (living people)
Living people
Norwegian female handball players